Janata Mahavidyalaya, is a major and general degree college situated in Tinsukia, Assam. This college is affiliated with the Dibrugarh University.

Departments

Arts
Assamese
English
History
Education
Economics
Philosophy
Political Science
Sociology

References

External links

Universities and colleges in Assam
Colleges affiliated to Dibrugarh University
Educational institutions in India with year of establishment missing